The 2013–14 Arkansas State Red Wolves men's basketball team represented Arkansas State University during the 2013–14 NCAA Division I men's basketball season. The Red Wolves, led by sixth year head coach John Brady, played their home games at the Convocation Center, and were members of the Sun Belt Conference. They finished the season 19–13, 10–8 in Sun Belt play to finish in fourth place. They advanced to the semifinals of the Sun Belt Conference tournament where they lost to Georgia State.

Roster

Schedule

|-
!colspan=9 style="background:#cc092f; color:#FFFFFF;"| Exhibition
 

|-
!colspan=9 style="background:#cc092f; color:#FFFFFF;"| Regular season

|-
!colspan=9 style="background:#cc092f; color:#FFFFFF;"| 2014 Sun Belt tournament

References

Arkansas State Red Wolves men's basketball seasons
Arkansas State